The Nassau Inn is a full-service hotel in downtown Princeton, New Jersey, United States.  It first opened at 52 Nassau Street in 1769 in a home built in 1756.  The Inn experienced British occupation during the American Revolution and played host to members of the Continental Congress when it met in nearby Nassau Hall.  In 1937, the original inn was demolished to make way for the Palmer Square development and a new, larger, inn opened at 10 Palmer Square in 1938.  The hotel's restaurant, the Yankee Doodle Tap Room, has a large mural by Norman Rockwell, depicting Yankee Doodle, behind the bar.  It is within walking distance of Princeton University.

History

Colonial

The inn's first building, constructed in 1756 using brick imported from Holland, was built as the home of Judge Thomas Leonard, an eminent local citizen who had helped woo The College of New Jersey (now Princeton University) to relocate to Princeton.  On his death in 1769, the house was turned into a hotel by Christopher Beekman, who gave it the name College Inn.  The Inn quickly became the center of town life, and with its location on the King's Highway, at the midpoint between New York City and Philadelphia, played host to many of the notable figures of colonial America, including Paul Revere, Robert Morris, and Thomas Paine.

The Inn experienced the vicissitudes of the American Revolution, with the British occupation of Princeton in 1776 followed by George Washington's victory at the Battle of Princeton.  In 1783, the Continental Congress met in Nassau Hall, with many Founding Fathers staying in the Inn.  Hageman's 1879 history of Princeton relates that Mayor Morford of Princeton insisted that the assembly had met in the Inn, with its ballroom serving as the Court of Chancery.

Nineteenth Century

Christopher and Grace Beekman retired as proprietors of the Inn around the turn of the 19th century.  John Gifford took over management of the hotel, renaming it the Nassau Inn, sometimes Nassau Hotel, and  hanging a sign depicting Nassau Hall at the entrance.  In 1846, a new building, known as Mansion House, was built by noted local builder/architect Charles Steadman on the east side of the original structure, which then became known as the west wing.  In the 1880s the two buildings were combined.

Palmer Square

In the 1930s Edger Palmer, a major donor to Princeton University and leading figure in the town, desired to bring an urban redevelopment to Princeton similar in concept, if not scale, to Rockefeller Center in New York.  This led to the 1936–1939 creation of Palmer Square, a public square and planned development that combines stores, restaurants, and apartments, with a post office and a new building for the Nassau Inn.  The original buildings of the Inn were demolished; their former site is now Tiger Park, with a tiger statue commemorating Edger Palmer, standing opposite Nassau Presbyterian Church.  The new Inn was built facing the square and has itself come to be considered historic with its fine interiors and Norman Rockwell mural in the Yankee Doodle Tap Room.

The Inn underwent a 120-bed expansion in 1985, such that the hotel spans Palmer Square East.

Amenities

Approximately 120,000 guests check in each year.
  Its close proximity to Princeton University helps to maintain high occupancy rates at the inn.  The hotel allows pets, with a cleaning fee.  It is a popular wedding venue, with an outdoor patio available for ceremonies.  The restaurant, the Yankee Doodle Tap Room, is open for breakfast, lunch, and dinner, and the bar and lounge area has a fireplace.  Parking is available in the nearby Hulfish or Chambers Street garages.

See also

Palmer Square

References

External links
Official website

Hotels in New Jersey
Buildings and structures in Princeton, New Jersey